Gathering of Developers, Inc. (shortened as G.O.D. or GodGames, and branded as Gathering between 2003 and 2004) was an American video game publisher based in New York City. Founded by Mike Wilson and associates in January 1998 and originally based in Dallas, the company was acquired by Take-Two Interactive in May 2000. Between May 2000 and March 2001, Gathering of Developers also operated a division, On Deck Interactive, which acted as their mass market label. In August 2001, Take-Two Interactive closed Gathering of Developers' Dallas headquarters and moved the label in-house, to New York City. The label was shut down in September 2004, with all assets consumed by Global Star Software.

History 
Gathering of Developers was announced by Mike Wilson in 1997, with the official opening scheduled for January 1998. Wilson had previously been the CEO of Ion Storm, a video game developer. Wilson's stated vision for the company was to have a video games publisher run by experienced developers rather than marketeers and conventional businessmen.

The opening of the company took place on January 13, 1998. Co-founders included Harry Miller, Jim Bloom, Rick Stults and Doug Myres. The same month, video game developer Terminal Reality became an equity partner of Gathering of Developers, through which their vice-president, Brett Combs, took a seat on the publisher's board of directors. Other founding partners included Edge of Reality, 3D Realms, Epic Games, PopTop Software, and Ritual Entertainment. By February 1998, the company had struck an investment deal with Pennsylvania Merchants Group. On June 1, 1998, video game publisher Take-Two Interactive announced a "subsistantial non-equity investment" in Gathering of Developers, wherein Take-Two Interactive would distribute games published by Gathering of Developers. Take-Two Interactive later went on to acquire a 20% stake in the company by February 1999. Also in February 1999, Gathering of Developers co-founded the Independent Games Festival, which was to premier Game Developers Conference, and also co-hosted and funded the 1999 edition of it. In May 1999, Gathering of Developers signed an agreement with Sega to distribute eight of their games on the Heat.net platform.

During the Electronic Entertainment Expo trade shows, Gathering of Developers offered free barbecue, live music and beer to the nearly 10,000 attendees that would cross the street into their parking lot, dubbed the "Promised Lot". At the 2001 edition of the event, Gathering of Developers' booth displayed booth babes dressed up as schoolgirls to promote their adult content.

On May 1, 2000, Take-Two Interactive announced that they had acquired Gathering of Developers. The deal was signed mainly due to Gathering of Developers' financial instability. On May 4, 2000, Take-Two Interactive and Gathering of Developers launched On Deck Interactive as a publishing label for games with "a consumer friendly price point and a mass market appeal". Following the departure of On Deck Interactive's CEO Robert Westmoreland, the label was shut down again on March 5, 2001, with all of its upcoming games shifted to Gathering of Developers. On May 3, 2001, Gathering of Developers co-founder Myres unexpectedly died of an asthma attack. In his honor, Gathering of Developers announced the "Doug Myres Substance Award" in June that year, which would be handed out at the July 2001 edition of the Cyberathlete Professional League, with a donation to the Dallas Children's Advocacy Center made in the recipient's name. Gathering of Developers' Dallas offices were closed down by Take-Two Interactive in August 2001, with all operations relocated to Take-Two Interactive's headquarters in New York City. All staff were laid off or left the company, most of which were then hired by SubstanceTV, a new venture previously launched by Wilson and Myres. By February 2003, Gathering of Developers had been shortened to Gathering. On September 9, 2004, following poor financial results in Take-Two Interactive's Q3 2004 fiscal quarter, Gathering of Developers was folded into Global Star Software, Take-Two Interactive's budget range publishing label.

Games published

References 

Take-Two Interactive divisions and subsidiaries
Defunct companies based in Texas
Video game companies established in 1998
Video game companies disestablished in 2004
Defunct video game companies of the United States
Video game publishers
1998 establishments in Texas
2004 disestablishments in Texas